The Fiji national under 20 rugby team is for Fijian rugby union players aged 20 or under on January 1 of the year during which they are selected.

Under 20 age grade rugby came into existence, as a result of the IRB combining the Under 19 Rugby World Championship and Under 21 Rugby World Championship into a single IRB Junior World Championship tournament.

Since 2014, the Fiji under-20 team has been invited to compete at the Australian Under 20 Rugby Championship.

Junior World Championship / Trophy

Overview
 2008 World Championship: 14th
 2009 World Championship: 12th
 2010 World Championship: 8th
 2011 World Championship: 6th
 2012 World Championship: 11th
 2013 World Championship: 11th
 2014 World Championship: 12th
 2015 World Trophy: 6th
 2016 World Trophy: 3rd
 2017 World Trophy: qualified

2008

In June 2008 Wales hosted the 2008 IRB Junior World Championship. Fiji lost all of its pool matches, going down to England 41-17 then losing to Australia by 53-17 before going down in a close match against Canada by 10-17. In the 13th-16th Places Playoffs, Fiji beat USA before going down to Tonga and finishing 14th overall out of 16.

2009
In June 2009, Japan hosted the 2009 IRB Junior World Championship. Fiji lost its first two matches against South Africa (36-10) and France (48-25) before defeating Italy by 20-14 with tries to Ledua and Matawalu. Fiji lost out to Scotland in the semifinal playoffs and then losing to Argentina in the 11th place play off and finished overall at 12th position and due to its 12th finish, qualified for the next championship in 2010 which was reduced to 12 teams.

2010
In June 2010, Argentina hosted the 2010 IRB Junior World Championship. Fiji played its first game against 2 times winners New Zealand going down 44-11 with tries to Christopher Nasiganyavi and 2 penalties to Josh Matavesi. They were thumped 31-13 by Wales but accounted for Samoa beating them 15-12. In the 5th place play-off, Fiji were beaten 44-9 by France before losing to Wales again in the 7th place play off by 39-15 and finishing 8th overall.

2011
In June 2011, Italy hosted the 2011 IRB Junior World Championship. Fiji played its first game against France losing 24-12 before getting thrashed 50-25 by Australia. Fiji then went on to beat Tonga 36-18. In the 5th-8th place play-off, Fiji thrashed Wales by 34-20 before getting thrashed by South Africa by  104-17 who scored 14 tries to 2. Even after the loss, Fiji finished at its best ever position of 6th.

Squads

2015
Squad to the 2015 World Rugby Under 20 Trophy:
Pateresio Beramaisuva
Timoci Bulitavu
Jone Jordan Cama
Kaveni Dabenaise
Waisea Vasuitoga Daroko
Filipo Daugunu
Rupeni Laganikoro
Ratu Josefa Logavatu
Eroni Mawi
Serupepeli Momo
Seveci Nakailagi
Peniami Narisia
Leone Nawai
Ilisavani Nasemira
Mateo Qolisese
Josaia Raboiliku
Tevita Ratuva
Viliame Ravouvou
Jone Seuvou
Asaeli Sorovaki
Lekima Tagitagivalu
Sela Toga
Vatiliai Tuidraki
Manuele Tuiqali
Seremaia Turagabeci
Filimoni Savou

Team Management
Coach – Viliame Gadolo
Assistant coach – Kele Leawere
Technical Trainer – Mosese Rauluni
Strength & Conditioning Coach - Mathew Dooley
Team Doctor – Dr Josefa Dakuinamako
Physio – Talisa Whippy
Manager – Jone Nute

2014

Notable former coaches
  Iliesa Tanivula (2010)
  Inoke Male (2011)

Notable former players
  Nikola Matawalu (2009)
  Metuisela Talebula (2009)
  Noa Nakaitaci (2008)
  Maritino Nemani (2010)
  Josh Matavesi (2010)
  Tevita Kuridrani (2010)
  Semi Radradra (2011)
  Samu Kerevi (2012)
  Ben Volavola (2012)

See also

References

Under-20
Oceanian national under-20 rugby union teams